Doblin, Döblin, or Doeblin may refer to:

Hugo Döblin (1876–1960), German actor
Alfred Döblin (1878–1957), German novelist
30778 Döblin, minor planet named for Alfred Döblin
Wolfgang Doeblin (1915–1940), German-French mathematician, son of Alfred
Jay Doblin (1920–1989), American industrial designer
Rick Doblin (born 1953), American drug activist